Beechwood Cemetery is the national cemetery of Canada in Ottawa. 

Beechwood Cemetery or Beechwoods Cemetery may also refer to:

 Beechwood Cemetery (Durham, North Carolina)
 Beechwoods Cemetery (New Rochelle, New York)
 Beechwoods Cemetery (Washington Township, Pennsylvania)